Emphreus is a genus of longhorn beetles of the subfamily Lamiinae, containing the following species:

 Emphreus adlbaueri Teocchi & Sudre, 2009
 Emphreus ferruginosoides Breuning, 1971
 Emphreus ferruginosus (White, 1858)
 Emphreus lineatipennis Breuning, 1950
 Emphreus pachystoloides (Lacordaire, 1872)
 Emphreus rotundipennis Breuning, 1950
 Emphreus tuberculosus (Aurivillius, 1910)
 Emphreus wittei Breuning, 1954

References

Stenobiini